The 1919 Baden state election was held on 5 January 1919 to elect the 107 members of the Baden state constituent assembly.

Results

References 

Baden
1919
January 1919 events